The 2019–20 Sydney Thunder Women's season was the fifth in the team's history. Coached by Trevor Griffin and captained by Rachael Haynes, Sydney placed sixth in WBBL05 and failed to qualify for finals. Ending with the retirement of veterans Alex Blackwell and Rene Farrell, the season marked a changing of the guard for the Thunder through the unearthing of acclaimed young talent such as Hannah Darlington and Phoebe Litchfield.

Squad 
Each 2019–20 squad featured 15 active players, with an allowance of up to five marquee signings including a maximum of three from overseas. Australian marquees are players who held a national women's team contract at the time of signing for their WBBL|05 team.

Personnel changes made ahead of the season included:

 Trevor Griffin was appointed to the role of head coach, replacing Joanne Broadbent.
 Rachael Haynes assumed the captaincy, taking over from Alex Blackwell.
 Nicola Carey, Maisy Gibson and Belinda Vakarewa all departed the Thunder, joining the Hobart Hurricanes.
 After four seasons as an overseas marquee, Stafanie Taylor departed the Thunder and subsequently signed with the Adelaide Strikers.
 India marquee Harmanpreet Kaur did not return for WBBL|05 due to a conflicting national team schedule.
 Nida Dar filled the team's second overseas marquee position, making her the first Pakistani woman to sign a deal with an international cricket league.
 South Africa marquee Shabnim Ismail, returning to the competition for the first time since a short inaugural season stint with the Melbourne Renegades, filled the Thunder's final overseas player slot.
Changes made during the season included:
 On 1 November, Penrith batter Samantha Arnold was added to the squad as a local replacement player for an injured Kate Peterson (concussion).
 On 26 November, Olivia Porter was added to the squad as a local replacement player for Nida Dar who missed the end of the season due to national team commitments.

The table below lists the Thunder players and their key stats (including runs scored, batting strike rate, wickets taken, economy rate, catches and stumpings) for the season.

Ladder

Fixtures 

All times are local time

Statistics and awards 

 Most runs: Alex Blackwell – 317 (17th in the league)
 Highest score in an innings: Alex Blackwell – 65 (47) vs Melbourne Stars, 27 November
 Most wickets: Hannah Darlington – 16 (equal 8th in the league)
 Best bowling figures in an innings: Shabnim Ismail – 3/14 (4 overs) vs Melbourne Renegades, 26 October
 Most catches (fielder): Shabnim Ismail – 5 (equal 14th in the league)
 Player of the Match awards:
 Alex Blackwell – 2
 Shabnim Ismail, Phoebe Litchfield, Rachel Priest – 1 each
 Alex Blackwell Medal: Hannah Darlington
 WBBL|05 Young Gun Award: Hannah Darlington (winner), Phoebe Litchfield (nominated), Tahlia Wilson (nominated)

References

Notes

2019–20 Women's Big Bash League season by team
Sydney Thunder (WBBL)